Richard Philippe (January 10, 1990 in Valence, Drôme – 22 November 2018) was a French racecar driver who resided in Miami, Florida. He was the younger brother of Nelson Philippe.

After moving up from the go-kart ranks in 2005, at fifteen years old Philippe won the Formula BMW USA championship in his rookie season, and on June 19, 2005 he became the youngest driver ever to win a race at the Indianapolis Motor Speedway.  In 2006, he competed in the Champ Car Atlantic series with Forsythe Championship Racing.  In 2007, he competed in the World Series by Renault.  In 2009, Philippe ran for Genoa Racing in the Firestone Indy Lights Series until a crash on the high speed Kansas Speedway oval sidelined him for three races. He returned to the series with Team PBIR and competed in seven more races. He finished second twice, at Long Beach with Genoa and at Edmonton with PBIR, and finished 13th in points despite missing four races (he withdrew from the final race due to an ill-handling car in practice).

He died in a helicopter crash in the Dominican Republic on 22 November 2018.

Racing record

Career summary

American open–wheel racing results 
(key)

Atlantic Championship

Indy Lights

Complete Formula Renault 3.5 Series results
(key)

Complete Formula 3 Euro Series results
(key)

References

External links 
 Official website
 Richard Philippe career statistics at Driver Database

1990 births
2018 deaths
Sportspeople from Valence, Drôme
French racing drivers
Atlantic Championship drivers
Formula 3 Euro Series drivers
Indy Lights drivers
Formula BMW USA drivers
World Series Formula V8 3.5 drivers
Victims of aviation accidents or incidents in the Dominican Republic
Carlin racing drivers
SG Formula drivers
Fortec Motorsport drivers
Forsythe Racing drivers